Voltaire Ylagan "Butch" Rosales was a Filipino Executive Judge of the Regional Trial Court, Branch 83, Tanauan, Batangas, Philippines.

Early life and education

Judge Voltaire Rosales obtained his Bachelor of Arts from the De La Salle University where he majored in Political Science. From there he went on 
to receive his LLB from the Ateneo Law School where he was a scholar and a member of the Fraternal Order of Utopia.

Voltaire Y. Rosales took the bar examinations in 1981 and landed in the twenty-fifth place with a grade of 84.5 percent. He then started his legal career as an attorney at the Santos, Balgos and Perez Law Office. After, Voltaire Rosales worked as Chief of Staff for Congressman Rafael B. Legaspi of the lone district of Aklan.

In 1986, he joined the Office of the Solicitor General and rose to the rank of Senior Solicitor. Ten years after, in 1995, he was sworn in as a Regional Trial Court Judge of Tanauan, Batangas by Chief Justice Reynato Puno. Soon after he was promoted to Executive Judge assigned to handle multiple salas handling heinous crimes.

As an Executive RTC Judge

Voltaire Y. Rosales took the ringing words of Justice Pompeyo Diaz to heart when he donned the robes of a judge. He plunged himself into his work with dedication. He served with a burning passion for justice and shining compassion for the victims of injustice. The lowliest citizen could stand before his courtroom unafraid of the mightiest tycoon, for he was confident that in the court of Judge Voltaire Y. Rosales justice would be dispensed in accordance with the Roman Maxim, "Let justice be done though the heavens fall."

Despite his overload of cases and the inadequacy of the court facilities, Judge Voltaire Y. Rosales continued to discharge his duties with dedication. He would spend his own money for his court.

Realizing that drugs are the bane of the youth and recognizing that justice is the foundation of an orderly society, Judge Voltaire Y. Rosales applied the full force of the law on drug dealers, kidnappers, and gangsters. He would pray to seek divine guidance before writing his decisions.

While he devoted his public life to his fellowmen, Judge Voltaire Y. Rosales dedicated his private life to God and his family. He was a devotee of the Sacred Heart, a Eucharistic minister, and household head of the Couples for Christ.

Soon, Judge Voltaire Y. Rosales started receiving offers of money and threats to his life. He remained steadfast in his commitment to the highest ideals and the noblest standards of his legal education at the College of Law of the Ateneo De Manila University. Judge Rosales would later convict a vindictive drug addict and criminal named German Agojo. Agojo would be sentenced to life imprisonment at Bilibid Prison, Muntinlupa. Even as the threats to Judge Rosales's life became more ominous, he refused to follow up his transfer to a safer jurisdiction. He believed that if he should be killed in the line of duty, it only meant that God had decided to call him and he was ready to meet his destiny.

Death and legacy

On June 10, 2004 he was assassinated a few meters away from his court. Judge Rosales was just on his way home from work when he was ambushed and assassinated by shooters riding-in-tandem. It was suspected that his assassination was related to the Agojo drug case he was handling as a Heinous Crimes Judge. Despite the many threats to his life by the drug lord, determined to let justice be done though the heavens fall, Judge Voltaire Rosales convicted the drug dealer.

Awards and recognition

Since his murder he has been honored with prestigious awards, such as the inaugural Ka Pepe Diokno Human Rights Award in 2005, the Lux in Domino by the Ateneo de Manila University, a Special Citation from the Provincial Peace and Order Council of Batangas (2004), a Kampon ni Pakakak Award (2004), the Fraternal Order of Utopia's President's Awards for Excellence (2005), and the Barangay Dasmariñas Government Service/ Law Award (2006). On June 10, 2014, Ateneo Law School honored Judge Rosales by dedicating a law school classroom in his name. The room, now called the "Executive Judge Voltaire Y. Rosales Room" was blessed after a Red Mass in his honor, this is one of three classrooms named after alumni of the school, with the other being Antique Gov. Evelio Javier and human rights lawyer Bobby Arevalo Gana; Rosales is the only judge with this honor of having a classroom in his name, and all three share the similarity of being martyred or dying at a young age.

Effects of his death on the judiciary

After his assassination in 2004, the Supreme Court of the Philippines abolished the heinous crimes court (Courts tasked to decide cases on kidnapping, robbery, murder and other felonies punishable by death or capital punishment) in order to diffuse concentration of heinous crimes on a single Judge.

In 2009, Agojo, the notorious drug lord whom Judge Rosales convicted of violating the Philippine Dangerous Drugs Act was suspected of sending death threats to  Supreme Court Justice Arturo Brion. Justice Brion reportedly blocked the acquittal of the drug lord and affirmed the conviction of the death sentence.

Judge Voltaire Y. Rosales has come to be known for being "fearless, upright and evenhanded" bringing honor to the maligned judicial system of the Philippines.

References

External links
Judges Among the Victims
Judge Slain in Batangas
Cooler Heads
A Son's Tribute to a Fallen Hero

1955 births
2004 deaths
People from Manila
20th-century Filipino judges
Ateneo de Manila University alumni
De La Salle University alumni
21st-century Filipino judges